Thyroid-like follicular renal cell carcinoma is rare subtype of renal cell carcinoma.

References

Kidney cancer